During the 1991–92 English football season, Tranmere Rovers F.C. competed in the Football League Second Division.

Season summary
In the 1991–92 season, Tranmere made a satisfying start to the campaign with only one defeat from their first eight league games and were mid-table by 8 November but their form began to dip afterwards where Tranmere won only 2 from their 14 league games and by 3 March were in 17th place and only 5 points clear of the relegation zone but in their final 16 league matches, Tranmere's form slightly improved, winning six of them which was enough to keep them up and they finished in 14th place.

Final league table

Results
Tranmere Rovers' score comes first

Legend

Football League Second Division

FA Cup

Rumbelows Cup

Zenith Data Systems Cup

Squad

References

Tranmere Rovers F.C. seasons
Tranmere Rovers